Naser Beadini (20 May 1962 – 16 January 1992) was a Yugoslav football forward who played for clubs in the former Yugoslavia and Turkey.

Career
Born in Tetovo, SR Macedonia, back then within Yugoslavia, Beadini began playing football for local side FK Teteks. He helped Teteks gain promotion to the Yugoslav First League during his four seasons with the club.

Beadini joined Turkish Süper Lig side Eskişehirspor in 1985. After three seasons, ho moved to rivals Samsunspor for two seasons. He returned to Eskişehirspor for the following season, before moving to Kayserispor in 1991.

Personal
Beadini, together with another player and a trainer, died in a traffic accident near Eskişehir on 16 January 1992.

References

External links
 
 
 Profile at Kayserispor.org

1962 births
1992 deaths
Sportspeople from Tetovo
Association football forwards
Yugoslav footballers
Macedonian footballers
FK Teteks players
Eskişehirspor footballers
Samsunspor footballers
Kayseri Erciyesspor footballers
Yugoslav First League players
Süper Lig players
Macedonian expatriate footballers
Yugoslav expatriate footballers
Expatriate footballers in Turkey
Macedonian expatriate sportspeople in Turkey
Yugoslav expatriate sportspeople in Turkey
Road incident deaths in Turkey